The Dufferin-Peel Catholic District School Board (DPCDSB, known as English-language Separate District School Board No. 43 prior to 1999) is the separate school board that oversees 153 Catholic school facilities (125 elementary schools, 26 secondary or high schools and 2 continuing education schools or adult learning centers) throughout Peel Region (Mississauga, Brampton, Caledon) and Dufferin County (including Orangeville). It employs roughly 5,000 teachers; about 3,000 at the elementary level, and the remaining 2,000 at the secondary school and continuing education level.

Its headquarters is on Matheson Boulevard West in Mississauga. The board was previously known as the Dufferin-Peel Separate School Board (DPSSB) before 1998.

History
The Dufferin-Peel Catholic District School Board is the successor to the Dufferin-Peel Separate School Board, which was established in 1969 by the merger of eight small separate boards.

As of 1986 the Dufferin-Peel Separate School Board was Ontario's second largest Catholic school board. On January 1, 1998, the DPSSB was renamed to DPCDSB and its French schools within the board became part of the Conseil scolaire de district catholique Centre-Sud.

By 1999 the district had a co-operative transportation service with the Peel District School Board. During that year its school operation costs were $4.65 ($ when adjusted for inflation) per square foot. The funding guidelines by a ministry were $5.20 ($ when adjusted for inflation).

Around the time of the DPSSB's existence, the board operated six francophone schools.

School bus transportation
In addition to local transit systems Brampton Transit and MiWay (Mississauga Transit) there are a number of transportation providers under contract for the DPCDSB:

Attridge Transportation
Cook Bus Lines
Denny Bus Lines
First Student Canada
Parkview Transit
Switzer-Carty Transportation

Schools
As of 1999, there is one dual DPCDSB-Peel District School Board Catholic-secular public school.

Continuing Education
Blessed Trinity Catholic Centre For Learning
Brian J. Fleming Center
St. Dunstan Catholic Language Learning Center
St. Gabriel Adult Education Center
St. Kateri Tekakwitha Catholic Learning Centre

Secondary schools
Ascension of Our Lord Secondary School, Mississauga
Cardinal Ambrozic Secondary School, Brampton
Cardinal Leger Secondary School, Brampton
Father Michael Goetz Secondary School, Mississauga
Holy Name of Mary Secondary School (all girls school), Brampton. 
Iona Catholic Secondary School, Mississauga
John Cabot Catholic Secondary School, Mississauga
Loyola Catholic Secondary School, Mississauga
Notre Dame Catholic Secondary School, Brampton
Our Lady of Mount Carmel Secondary School, Mississauga
Philip Pocock Catholic Secondary School, Mississauga
Robert F. Hall Catholic Secondary School, Caledon
St. Aloysius Gonzaga Secondary School, Mississauga
St. Augustine Catholic Secondary School, Brampton
St. Edmund Campion Secondary School, Brampton
St. Francis Xavier Secondary School, Mississauga
St. Joan of Arc Catholic Secondary School, Mississauga
St. Joseph's Secondary School, Mississauga
St. Marcellinius Secondary School, Mississauga
St. Marguerite d'Youville Secondary School, Brampton
St. Martin Secondary School, Mississauga
St. Michael Catholic Secondary School, Caledon
St. Oscar Romero Catholic Secondary School (alternative high school), Mississauga
St. Paul Secondary School, Mississauga
St. Roch Catholic Secondary School, Brampton
St. Thomas Aquinas Secondary School, Brampton

Elementary schools

All Saints Separate School
Bishop Francis Allen School
Blessed Micheal J. McGivney
Bishop Scalabrini Separate School
Canadian Martyrs Catholic School
Christ the King Separate School
Corpus Christi Separate School
Divine Mercy Elementary School
Father C.W. Sullivan School
Father Clair Tipping School
Father Daniel Zanon School
Father Francis McSpiritt Catholic Elementary School
Georges Vanier Catholic School
Good Shepherd Elementary School
Guardian Angels Elementary School
Holy Cross Separate School
Holy Family Elementary School
Holy Spirit Elementary School
Lester B. Pearson Catholic School
Mary Fix Catholic School
Metropolitan Andrei Separate School
Our Lady of Fatima School
Our Lady of Good Voyage School
Our Lady of Lourdes Catholic Elementary School
Our Lady of Mercy Elementary School
Our Lady of Peace Separate School
Our Lady of Providence School
Pauline Vanier Catholic Elementary School
Queen of Heaven Elementary School
Sacred Heart Elementary School
San Lorenzo Ruiz Elementary School
St. Agnes Elementary School
St. Aidan Elementary School
St. Albert of Jerusalem Elementary School
St. Alfred Separate School
St. Alphonsa Catholic Elementary School
St. Andrew Elementary School
St. Angela Merici Catholic Elementary School
St. Andre Bessette Catholic Elementary school
St. Anne Elementary School
St. Anthony Elementary School
St. Barbara Elementary School
St. Basil Elementary School
St. Benedict Elementary School
St. Bernadette Elementary School
St. Bernard of Clairvaux Catholic Elementary School
St. Bonaventure Catholic Elementary School
St. Brigid Elementary School
St. Catherine of Siena Separate School
St. Cecilia Catholic Elementary School
St. Charles Garnier School
St. Christopher Separate School
St. Clare Separate School
St. Cornelius Elementary School
St. Daniel Comboni Catholic Elementary School
St. David of Wales Separate School
St. Dominic Separate School
St. Edith Stein Elementary School
St. Edmund Separate School
St. Elizabeth Seton School
St. Evan Catholic Elementary School

St. Faustina Elementary School
St. Francis Xavier Elementary School
St. Francis of Assisi Catholic School
St. Gerard Separate School
St. Gregory Elementary School
St. Helen Separate School
St. Herbert Elementary School
St. Hilary Elementary School
St. Isaac Jogues Elementary School
St. Jacinta Marto Catholic Elementary School
St. James Catholic Global Learning Centre (International Baccalaureate Elementary Program)
St. Jean Brebeuf Elementary School
St. Jean-Marie Vianney Catholic Elementary School
St. Jerome Separate School
St. Joachim Elementary School
St. John Bosco School
St. John Fisher Elementary School
St. John Henry Newman Catholic Elementary School
St. John Paul II Catholic Elementary School
St. John of the Cross Catholic School
St. John the Baptist Elementary School
St. John XXIII Catholic Elementary School
St. Joseph School (Mississauga)
St. Joseph School (Brampton)
St. Josephine Bakhita Catholic Elementary School
St. Jude Separate School
St. Julia Catholic Elementary School
St. Kevin Separate School
St. Leonard Elementary School ** Temporary relocated at St. Rita Elementary School 
St. Louis Separate School
St. Lucy Catholic Elementary School
St. Luke Elementary School
St. Margaret of Scotland School
St. Marguerite Bourgeoys Separate School
St. Maria Goretti School
St. Mark Separate School
St. Mary Elementary School
St. Matthew Catholic School
St. Monica Elementary School
St. Nicholas Elementary School
St. Patrick Separate School
St. Peter Elementary School
St. Philip Elementary School
St. Pio of Pietrelcina Elementary School
St. Raphael Elementary School
St. Raymond Elementary School
St. Richard Catholic Elementary School
St. Rita Elementary School
St. Rose of Lima Separate School
St. Sebastian Catholic Elementary School
St. Simon Stock Elementary School
St. Sofia Catholic School (Ukrainian Catholic)
St. Stephen Elementary School
St. Teresa of Avila Separate School
St. Teresa of Calcutta School
St. Timothy Elementary School
St. Therese of the Child Jesus School
St. Thomas More Separate School
St. Ursula Elementary School
St. Valentine Elementary School
St. Veronica Elementary School
St. Vincent de Paul Separate School
Sts. Martha and Mary Catholic School
Sts. Peter & Paul Separate School

Defunct Schools
 Blessed Trinity Elementary (repurposed for continuing education)
 Our Lady of the Airways Elementary (sold to the City of Mississauga)
 Mother Mary Ward Elementary (sold on open market to independent school)
 St. Dunstan Elementary (repurposed for IL site and adult education)
 St. Gabriel Elementary (repurposed for continuing education)
 St. Gertrude Elementary
 St. James Elementary (repurposed as a regional elementary school)
 St. Mary's Elementary (Port Credit) (leased to a child care operator)
 St. Michael Elementary (sold to the City of Mississauga)

Controversies

Enrollment of non-Catholics
As with other school boards, Catholic high schools are funded by the provincial government, making them open to any students who wish to attend, while elementary schools do not have to enroll non-Catholic students. Critics argue that the practice of fully funding separate schools exclusively for the Roman Catholic faith is discriminatory to other religions (the United Nations has twice criticized the province for this policy). Supporters of the current Catholic education system point out that it has existed, in one form or another, since Confederation, and that the Constitution Act, 1867 enshrines the right to government-funded religious education to all Catholics.  The opposition argues that this is an appeal to tradition, and point to other provinces in Canada which amended the constitution to abolish Catholic school funding. It is up to the school principal whether or not non-Catholics are enrolled.

“Black-boys” book
The board encountered controversy in 2019 when a book, titled The Guide for White Women Who Teach Black Boys, was shown on the principal's desk. This sparked various online debates on the internet.  The book, written by American researchers and published in 2017, provides help and advice for teachers to create learning environments in which black students feel nurtured and engaged.

See also

Peel District School Board
Upper Grand District School Board
List of school districts in Ontario
List of high schools in Ontario
Archdiocese of Toronto

References

External links
Dufferin-Peel Catholic District School Board

Roman Catholic school districts in Ontario
Education in the Regional Municipality of Peel
Education in Dufferin County
School districts established in 1969
1969 establishments in Ontario
1969 establishments in Canada
Roman Catholic Archdiocese of Toronto